A goanna is any of several Australian monitor lizards of the genus Varanus.

Goanna may also refer to:
 Goanna fish, Halosaurus pectoralis
 Goanna (band), an Australian folk-rock band
 "The Goanna", a codename for Australian businessman Kerry Packer, used in media reports about the Costigan Commission
 Goanna (software), an open source rendering and layout engine